Rafaela Alburquerque "Lili" de González (born 19 September 1947), is a Dominican lawyer and diplomat. Since 15 August 2016, she has been a deputy for the province of San Pedro de Macorís for Social Christian Reformist Party . From May 2011 to April 2017, she served as Ambassador of the Dominican Republic to the Chinese Republic of Taiwan; being for 8 months in a duality of public functions that was criticized, because Alburquerque enjoyed two salaries from the State.

Lila Alburquerque was born in San José de los Llanos, in Dominican Republic and got a doctorate in Laws for Universidad Central del Este.
She had been the Consul General of the Dominican Republic in Antwerp, Belgium (1997-1998) and Hamburg, Germany (1994-1997).
She was elected deputy in 1986, and was the first female President of the Chamber of Deputies of the Dominican Republic between 1999 and 2003. She also Minister without Portofolio between February and May 2011.

External links

References

1947 births
Living people
Dominican Republic women lawyers
Dominican Republic women diplomats
Women government ministers of the Dominican Republic
Women members of the Congress of the Dominican Republic
Presidents of the Chamber of Deputies of the Dominican Republic
Ambassadors to Taiwan
20th-century Dominican Republic women politicians
20th-century Dominican Republic politicians
21st-century Dominican Republic women politicians
21st-century Dominican Republic politicians
People from San Pedro de Macorís
Social Christian Reformist Party politicians
Recipients of the Order of Brilliant Star
Dominican Republic women ambassadors
20th-century Dominican Republic lawyers